Echi no Takutsu (kanji 朴市田来津) died in 663 at the Battle of Baekgang.

The Nihon Shoki records that in 661, Naka-no-Oe (soon to be the Emperor Tenji) sent a group of generals to help the country Baekje in its fight against Tang China and the kingdom of Silla. In what could almost be considered a side-note, the text states, "Takutsu, Hada no Miyakko, of Lower Shousen rank..." was sent to help Baekje.  Echi no Takutsu is said to have died a heroic death at Baekgang, slaying "tens of men."

External links
Asuka Period

663 deaths
People of Asuka-period Japan
Year of birth unknown